The 2015 K League Challenge was the third season of the K League Challenge, the second tier South Korean professional league for association football clubs, since its establishment in 2013. From the 2014 season, a top place team was promoted to the K League Classic and the promotion play-offs among three clubs ranked between 2nd and 4th took place after the regular season ends.

Teams
Daejeon Citizen, the champions of the 2014 K League Challenge, and Gwangju FC, a promotion series winners, were promoted to 2015 K League Classic, then Gyeongnam FC and Sangju Sangmu were relegated from the top tier. A total of eleven teams contested the league, including a new team Seoul E-Land FC.

Participating clubs

Stadiums 
Primary venues used in the K League Challenge:

Personnel and kits

Note: Flags indicate national team as has been defined under FIFA eligibility rules. Players may hold more than one non-FIFA nationality.

Foreign players
Restricting the number of foreign players strictly to four per team, including a slot for a player from AFC countries. A team could use four foreign players on the field each game.

League table

Positions by matchday

Round 1-22

Round 23-44

Results

Matches 1-22

Matches 23-44

Promotion-Relegation Playoffs
Promotion and relegation playoffs will be held between 2nd~4th clubs of 2015 K League Challenge and 11th club of 2015 K League Classic. If scores are tied after regular time at Semi-Playoff and Playoff, the higher placed team advances to the next phase. The same conditions do not apply to Promotion-Relegation Playoffs.

Semi-Playoff

Playoff

Promotion-Relegation Playoffs

First leg

Second leg

''Suwon FC secure promotion to the 2016 K League Classic season, 3–0 on aggregate.

Season statistics

Top scorers

Top assists

Attendance

Awards

Most Valuable Player of The Round

Manager of the Month

Season Awards 
The 2015 K League Awards was held on 1 December 2015.

K League Challenge Most Valuable Player
The K League Challenge Most Valuable Player award was won by  Johnathan (Daegu FC).

K League Challenge Top Scorer

The K League Challenge Top Scorer award was won by  Johnathan (Daegu FC).

K League Challenge Top Assistor

The K League Challenge Top Assistor award was won by  Kim Jae-sung (Seoul E-Land FC).

K League Challenge Best XI

K League Challenge Manager of the Year
The K League Challenge Manager of the Year award was won by  Cho Duck-je (Suwon FC).

References

 2014 Season Review at K League Website

External links
Official K League Website 

K League Challenge seasons
K
K
K